Tab Hunter Confidential is a 2015 American documentary film focusing on the American actor, singer, and author Tab Hunter. It is inspired by his autobiography of the same name.  The film was produced by Allan Glaser and directed by Jeffrey Schwarz.

The film features extensive interviews with Hunter, as well as contemporaries and associates, including John Waters, Clint Eastwood, Debbie Reynolds, and more.

Background 

In 2005, Hunter's autobiography, Tab Hunter Confidential: The Making of a Movie Star (2005), co-written with Eddie Muller, became a New York Times best-seller, and again topped the charts when it was released in paperback in 2007, as well as in 2015, following the release of the documentary. The book served as Hunter's first person account of his rise to Hollywood heartthrob status in the 1950s, as well as his personal struggle with revealing his sexuality over the course of his career.

Acknowledging he was gay in the book, the tone set a new precedent for discussion of Hollywood's golden era.

Following Hunter's participation in Jeffrey Schwarz's documentary I Am Divine (about Baltimore drag queen Divine, with whom Hunter had appeared in several motion pictures), producer Allan Glaser approached Schwarz about the potential of adapting the Confidential book into a feature-length documentary.

Filming began in 2011 conducting a series of new interviews with Hunter and associates in Los Angeles, New York,  Paris and Santa Barbara., as well as culling archival footage of figures from Hollywood's past discussing the star. Filming was completed in 2015.

Release 

Tab Hunter Confidential premiered at South by Southwest (SXSW) in 2015, and played over 100 film festivals and independent screenings.

The film was also given a theatrical release in October 2015, premiering  in New York at The Village East and in Los Angeles at the Nuart Theater, playing theatrically in over 50 cities.

Participants

Archive footage

Reception and awards 

Receiving favorable reviews from critics, Tab Hunter Confidential has been praised for its portrait not only of Hunter, but of Hollywood during the actor's heyday. Vanity Fair called it “A savvy, rollicking, eye-popping film. Brave for its candor and enlightening for the social context it provides,” while IndieWire posited that the film was “fun and gossipy in the way that great documentaries about Hollywood often are, but it also speaks to a deeper truth about identity and perseverance and the large divide between one's personal and professional life.”

The film has been nominated and won a multitude of awards, including the Best Documentary at the California Independent Film Festival, the Audience and Festival Awards for Best Documentary at the FilmOut San Diego Film Festival, Best Feature at the Louisville LGBT Film Festival, and the Audience Award for Best Documentary at the Miami Gay and Lesbian Film Festival. Tab Hunter Confidential was also long listed for consideration for Best Documentary for the 2015 Academy Awards.

In January 2016, Tab Hunter Confidential was nominated for "Outstanding Documentary" at the 27th GLAAD Media Awards.

Notes

References

Further reading

External links 
 Official Site
 
 Tab Hunter Confidential at Rotten Tomatoes
 Tab Hunter Confidential at Facebook

American documentary films
Documentary films about gay men
American LGBT-related films
2015 films
2015 documentary films
2015 LGBT-related films
Films directed by Jeffrey Schwarz
Documentary films about LGBT topics
2010s English-language films
2010s American films